Merlie M. Alunan (born December 14, 1943) is a Filipina poet.

Life
Merlie M. Alunan was born December 14, 1943, in Dingle, Iloilo.
Alunan graduated from Silliman University with an MA in creative writing in 1974. 
She teaches at the Creative Writing Center, University of the Philippines Visayas Tacloban College.
She lives in Tacloban City.

Honors and awards

Local awards, honors, and distinctions 

 1984 - Likhaan Award for Poetry, UP Creative Writing Center
 1994 - Free Press Literary Award for Poetry
 1995 - Free Press Literary Award for Poetry
 1995 - Home Life Magazine Poetry Writing Contest, Second Prize, "Hunger"
 1996 - Chancellor's Award for Outstanding Creative Work
 1997 - Gawad Alagad ni Balagtas Award, UMPIL (Unyon ng mga Manunulat sa Pilipinas)
 2003 - Catholic Mass Media Award for Best Column, Cebu Daily News
 2004 - Home Life Magazine Poetry Writing Contest, First Prize, "Mater Dolorosa in Two Voices"
 1995 - Distinguished Faculty Grant, University of the Philippines
 2007 - Second Prize Tula sa Cebuano, Gawad Komisyon ng Wikang Filipino
 2008  - Selected Poems (UP Press, 2004), listed among the UP Centennial Publications 
 December 13, 2008 - Professor Emeritus, University of the Philippines.
 July 2, 2009 - Sangyaw Achievement Award, City of Tacloban.
 2014 - Ani ng Dangal (Literary Arts), NCCA.
 2015 - Gawad Kampeon ng Wika, Komisyon sa Wikang Filipino (KWF) 
 2018 - Garbo sa Ormoc for Literary Arts, Ormoc City, Leyte.

International awards, honors, and distinctions 

 1997 - Honorable Mention, Lilian Jerome Thornton Award for Poetry
 September 2010 - Ananda Coomaraswamy Fellowship in Literature, Sahitya Akademi, Republic of India.
 July 26, 2013 - Sunthorn Phu Award for Poetry, Government of Thailand.

Works
Hearthstone, Sacred Tree, Anvil, 1993,  
Amina among the angels, University of the Philippines Press, 1997,  
Selected poems, University of the Philippines Press, 2004, 
Tales of the Spider Woman, University of Santo Tomas Publishing House, 2010.
Pagdakop sa Bulalakaw ug uban pang mga Balak, Ateneo de Manila University Press, 2013.
Running with Ghosts, Ateneo de Naga University Press, 2018.

Non-fiction
 Kabilin Legacy of 100 years of Negros Occidental, Negros Oriental Centennial Foundation, 1993.  (Co-editor with Bobby Villasis)

Edited anthologies
 Fern Garden: An Anthology of Women Writing in the South, Committee on Literature, National Commission on Culture and the Arts, 1998, 
An Siday han DYVL, NCCA, UPTC VisWrite, Province of Leyte, DYVL Aksyon Radyo, 2005. 
The Dumaguete We Know, Anvil Publishing, 2011.
Our Memory of Water Words After Haiyan, Ateneo de Naga University Press, 2016.
Sa Atong Dila, Introduction to Visayan Literature, University of the Philippines Press. 2016. 
Susumaton, Oral Narratives of Leyte, Ateneo de Manila University Press, 2017. 
Tinalunay, Anthology of Waray Literature, University of the Philippines Press. 2018

Anthologies
Songs of ourselves: writings by Filipino women in English, Editor Edna Zapanta-Manlapaz, Anvil Publishing, 1994,

References

External links
Author's blog

1943 births
Living people
20th-century Filipino poets
Writers from Iloilo
Writers from Leyte (province)
Silliman University alumni
People from Tacloban
People from Leyte (province)
Filipino women poets
20th-century Filipino women writers
21st-century Filipino women writers
21st-century Filipino writers